Riehl is a German surname. Notable people with the surname include:

Alois Riehl (1844–1924), Austrian philosopher
Emily Riehl, American mathematician
Herbert Riehl (1915-1997), German-born American meteorologist
Kevin Riehl (born 1971), Canadian professional ice hockey player
Nikolaus Riehl (1901–1990), German nuclear chemist
Walter Riehl (1881–1955), Austrian lawyer and politician 
Wilhelm Heinrich Riehl (1823–1897), German journalist, novelist and folklorist

German-language surnames